Halichondria arenacea is a species of sea sponge belonging to the family Halichondriidae.

References 

Halichondrida
Animals described in 1895